Yhlas Magtymov (20 April 1992) is a Turkmen professional footballer who plays for Şagadam FK and Turkmenistan as midfielder.

Club career 
At 2019 season signed a contract with Şagadam FK.

International career
He played for Turkmenistan youth team in Commonwealth of Independent States Cup 2012.

Magtymov made his senior national team debut on 8 August 2016, in friendly match against Oman national football team.

Honours

References

External links
 
 

1992 births
Living people
Turkmenistan footballers
Turkmenistan international footballers
Association football midfielders
FC Altyn Asyr players